From the Bottom to the Top is the debut studio album by American singer Sammie. It was released by Capitol Records on March 14, 2000 in the United States. Primarily produced by Dallas Austin, with additional production from Colin Wolfe, Ricco Lumpkins, and Tricky Stewart, it It peaked at number twenty-seven on the US Billboard 200 and number twenty on the US Billboard Top R&B/Hip-Hop Albums, selling over 744,000 copies to date. It spawned the singles "I Like It" and "Crazy Things I Do".

Critical reception

Allmusic senior editor Stephen Thomas Erlewine found that "at times, [Sammie's] voice does sound a little thin, but for the most part, it's surprisingly soulful and convincing – not as stunning and assured as the young Michael Jackson, but certainly a lot better than most child singers. If he's not yet skillful enough to disguise the sometimes uneven material, that's still forgivable, because the tracks that do work, work really well [...] The end result is the same: From the Bottom to the Top is entertaining, but not always engaging. Still, we have to remember that this is a debut album from a child singer. Judged on that basis, it's charming and, at times, impressive. Sammie does well this time out, and he'll probably do better next time around. ."

Track listing

Personnel 
Credits for From the Bottom to the Top adapted from Allmusic.

 Dallas Austin – composer, executive producer, producer
 Leslie Brathwaite – mixing
 Jasper Cameron - composer
 Kevin "KD" Davis – mixing
 Mark "Exit" Goodchild – engineer
 Traci Hale – composer
 John Horesco IV – editing
 Ty Hudson – assistant, engineer
 Joyce "Fenderella" Irby – composer, engineer
 Debra Killings - composer, vocals (background)
 Jimmy Killings – guitar
 Myra Killings – stylist
 Ricco Lumpkins – composer, producer
 Andrew Lyn – assistant engineer, engineer

 Carlton Lynn – engineer
 Tomi Martin – vocals (background)
 JT Money – featured artist, vocals
 Lloyd Polite – featured artist
 Claudine Pontier – assistant
 Sammie – primary artist, vocals (background)
 Rick Sheppard – MIDI, sound design
 Alvin Speights – bass, mixing
 Christopher "Tricky" Stewart – producer
 Brian "B-Luv" Thomas – engineer
 Jeff Thompkins – composer
 Stephanie Vonarx – assistant engineer
 Gary White – composer
 Colin Wolfe – composer, producer

Charts

Certifications

References

2000 debut albums
Capitol Records albums
Sammie albums
Teen pop albums